The Taipei Economic and Cultural Mission in Ankara; (Turkish: Taipei Ekonomik ve Kültür Misyonu) represents the interests of Taiwan in Turkey in the absence of formal diplomatic relations, functioning as a de facto embassy. It was established in 1993.

Turkey had diplomatic relations with Taiwan as the Republic of China until 1971, when it recognised the People's Republic of China.

Its counterpart in Taiwan is the Turkish Trade Office in Taipei.

The Office is headed by a Representative, currently Volkan Chih-Yang Huang.

See also
 List of diplomatic missions of Taiwan
 List of diplomatic missions in Turkey

References

External links
 Taipei Economic and Cultural Mission in Ankara

 
Taiwan
Turkey
Taiwan–Turkey relations
1993 establishments in Turkey
Organizations established in 1993